Eskimo Joe are an Australian alternative rock band, formed in 1997.

Eskimo Joe may also refer to:

 Eskimo Joe (EP), the band's eponymous 1999 EP
 Eskimo Joe (video), the band's eponymous 2005 DVD
 Eskimo Joe's, a restaurant and bar located in Stillwater, Oklahoma

See also
 Eskimo (disambiguation)
 Joe (disambiguation)